Da Game of Life is a 1998 direct-to-video short drama film starring No Limit Records rapper Snoop Dogg. It was directed by Michael Martin, written and produced by Master P and Snoop Dogg and distributed by No Limit Films. No Limit labelmate C-Murder co-stars. The movie was also a huge success for No Limit Records and for No Limit Films.

Cast
Snoop Dogg as Smooth
C-Murder as Money
Yuri Brown as Peaches
Jimmy Keller as Jasper
Lou Charloff as Don Cottafavi
WC as Bar Patron
Chris Mills as Scooter - basketball player

References

External links

1998 films
1998 crime drama films
Hood films
African-American films
American drama short films
American crime drama films
1990s English-language films
1990s American films